Sam Pillsbury is an American film director, producer, and winemaker.

Massachusetts-raised Sam Pillsbury emigrated to New Zealand at the age of 14. At age 23 he began working for the government-owned National Film Unit of New Zealand, joining a group of emerging filmmakers who were investigating new subjects and creative film making styles.

Pillsbury directed seven films at the National Film Unit, including a multi-faceted study of artist Ralph Hotere, and a satirical look at workplace relations (Men and Supermen). He was also part of the directing team on Commonwealth Games chronicle Games '74, and worked both on set and at the editing bench for Paul Maunder's Gone Up North for a While.

Pillsbury went solo in 1975. Documentary Birth with R.D.Laing won awards on both sides of the Tasman, and controversy in England and the United States. The film featured controversial Scottish psychiatrist R.D. Laing critiquing Western medical handling of childbirth. Pillsbury also worked on four documentaries for TV slot Seven Days, which variously looked into life for a solo mother, an ex-convict, hospital patients, and young Māori in the city.

More TV documentaries followed, then in 1978, Against the Lights, a short drama based on a Witi Ihimaera tale. Pillsbury's Round the Bays doco The Greatest Run on Earth won awards at festivals in Chicago and Torino.

Pillsbury's feature film debut in 1981 was with The Scarecrow, based on the gothic novel by Ronald Hugh Morrieson. Presented through the eyes of two teenage boys, the film chronicles the arrival in a 50s town of a mysterious stranger (played by American movie legend John Carradine). In 1982 The Scarecrow became the first Kiwi film to win invitation to the prestigious Cannes Film Festival, in the non-competitive Director's Fortnight section. Teen star Jono Smith later reinvented himself as a cinematographer in England.

Pillsbury then worked extensively on a screen adaptation of end of the world sci-fi novel The Quiet Earth, before handing the project to director Geoff Murphy after deciding it needed fresh eyes (he later joked at being one of the only directors who had fired himself). Instead Pillsbury helmed 1880s immigrant tale Heart of the High Country for TV (based on a novel by Elizabeth Gowans), then segued into period road movie Starlight Hotel, which starred Smash Palace discovery Greer Robson.

Since Starlight Hotel, Pillsbury has directed extensively, mainly on American tele-movies. He returned to Kiwi moviemaking in 2000 for Crooked Earth, the tale of a clash between two Māori: a militant drug-dealer, and former military man Temuera Morrison.

Pillsbury's other features include Free Willy 3: The Rescue, 2008 road movie Endless Bummer and Where The Red Fern Grows.

These days Pillsbury has a second career as a winemaker. In 2000 he and a business partner planted a Vineyard in Cochise County, Arizona, and in 2006 sold it to a group headed by Maynard James Keenan. Pillsbury Wine Company was launched soon afterwards, with his new vineyard & tasting room across the road in Willcox, Arizona, and a Tasting Room in Old Town Cottonwood, Arizona.

Pillsbury Wine has earned several national awards including Gold Medals in the Jefferson Cup, and several Double Gold Medals in the San Francisco Chronicle Wine Competition. 

Pillsbury's wife is the daughter of sculptor Geny Dignac.

Selected filmography
The Scarecrow (1982)
The Quiet Earth (1985, producer only)
Zandalee (1991)
Into the Badlands (1991) (TV)
Knight Rider 2010 (1994) (TV)
Eyes of Terror (1994) (TV)
Search for Grace (1994) (TV)
Shadows of Desire (1994) (TV)
Sins of Silence (1996) (TV)
A Mother's Instinct (1996) (TV)
Free Willy 3: The Rescue (1997)
Fifteen and Pregnant (1998) (TV)
Morgan's Ferry (2001)
Crooked Earth (2001)
Where the Red Fern Grows (2003)
Raising Waylon (2004) (TV)

References

External links

NZ On Screen profile

Pillsbury Wine official site

Living people
American emigrants to New Zealand
American film producers
American winemakers
Artists from Waterbury, Connecticut
Film directors from Connecticut
Film producers from Connecticut
New Zealand film directors
New Zealand film producers
Year of birth missing (living people)